This is a list of episodes for Seijuu Sentai Gingaman, the twenty-second incarnation of the long running Super Sentai series. Each episode is referred to as a chapter.

Episode list

References

Seijuu Sentai　Gingaman